Daegu Mirae College was a private college located in Gyeongsan City, South Korea, which neighbors the metropolitan city of Daegu.  About 80 instructors were employed.  In January 2018 Ministry of Education granted its voluntary closure which it filed for financial difficulties after receiving the lowest grade in Ministry's evaluation several times. It officially closed in the following month.

Academics

The college's academic offerings are offered through departments arranged under the divisions of Humanities and Safety, Natural Science, Engineering, and Arts and Physical Education.

History

The college opened its doors in 1981 as Daeil Industrial Technical College (대일실업전문대학).  It took its current name in 1998.

Sister schools

The college has international ties with America's Hawaii Pacific University and France's Paris American Academy.

See also
List of colleges and universities in South Korea
Education in South Korea

External links
Official school website, in Korean

References 

Universities and colleges in North Gyeongsang Province
1981 establishments in South Korea
Educational institutions established in 1981
Defunct universities and colleges in South Korea